Pronsfeld is a municipality in the district of Bitburg-Prüm, in Rhineland-Palatinate, western Germany.

Economy and infrastructure 
Pronsfeld is the location of the head office of MUH Arla, the largest UHT milk manufacturer in Europe.

References

Bitburg-Prüm